International Journal of Earth Sciences  is a peer-reviewed scientific journal published monthly by Springer Science+Business Media. It covers original and review papers on the history of earth and is an international Geoscience journal. Subject areas covered in the journal include: dynamics of the lithosphere, tectonics and volcanology, sedimentology, evolution of life, marine and continental ecosystems, global dynamics of physicochemical cycles, mineral deposits and hydrocarbons, and surface processes.

History 
The journal was founded in 1910 as Geologische Rundschau and was renamed in 1999.

Impact factor 
The journal has an impact factor of 2.7 (2021).

Editor 
The editor in chief is Ulrich Riller (Universität Hamburg, Germany).

References 

English-language journals
German-language journals
Geology journals
Springer Science+Business Media academic journals